The Kansai Kaisers football program represents Kansai University in college football. Kansai is a member of the Kansai Collegiate American Football League.

External links
 
American football teams established in 1935

American football in Japan
1935 establishments in Japan